Marine Hamelet (born 13 July 1967) is a French politician who has represented the 2nd constituency of the Tarn-et-Garonne department in the National Assembly since 2022. She is a member of the National Rally (RN).

Career
Hamelet holds a degree in law and a master's degree in business studies. She worked as an executive for a sales company.

In the 2022 legislative election, she stood as the National Rally candidate in the 2nd constituency of Tarn-et-Garonne. Her campaign was notably supported by fellow National Rally politician Romain Lopez, who has served as Mayor of Moissac since 2020. She won the seat and succeeded Sylvia Pinel of the Radical Party of the Left, who failed to qualify for the second round. Hamelet hereby became the first member of the National Assembly elected in Tarn-et-Garonne for the National Rally in history.

In Parliament, she sits on the Committee on Foreign Affairs.

Personal life
She resides in Saint-Orens-de-Gameville, Tarn-et-Garonne.

References 

1967 births
Living people
National Rally (France) politicians
Deputies of the 16th National Assembly of the French Fifth Republic
Women members of the National Assembly (France)
21st-century French women politicians
People from Tarn-et-Garonne
Politicians from Occitania (administrative region)